Selected Letters of Clark Ashton Smith is a book of letters by American writer Clark Ashton Smith. It was released in 2003 by Arkham House in an edition of approximately 3,000 copies.  The collection was edited by David E. Schultz and Scott Conners.

Contents

Selected Letters of Clark Ashton Smith includes letters to:

 George Sterling
 Frank Belknap Long
 Donald Wandrei
 H. P. Lovecraft
 August Derleth
 R. H. Barlow
 L. Sprague de Camp

2003 non-fiction books
Works by Clark Ashton Smith
Collections of letters
Arkham House books